Sendankadu is a village in the Pattukkottai taluk of Thanjavur district, Tamil Nadu, India.

Demographics 

As per the 2001 census, Sendankadu had a total population of 3248 with 1564 males and 1684 females. The sex ratio was 1077. The literacy rate was 70.11.

References 

 

Villages in Thanjavur district